Gisle Hannemyr (born 3 July 1953) is a researcher and lecturer at the Department of Informatics, University of Oslo.

Professional background 
In 1991, he was co-founder of the first commercial internet service provider in Norway, Oslonett, which later, being acquired by Schibsted, became Schibsted Nett (SN), and Scandinavia Online (Sol). He later co-founded other Internet-related businesses.

Through books, articles and regular columns in the press, Hannemyr has been active in describing and explaining not only the Internet, but also hacker culture to the public. In the public eye, he is regarded as Norway's foremost net guru and evangelist, and is the primary spokesperson for free software, free media formats and open net usage in Norwegian media.

In 2002, Hannemyr was awarded the Norwegian Computer Society's Rosing Honorary Prize, and in 2003, a vote among the Norwegian members of First Tuesday (an association of entrepreneurs and investors) declared him Internet personality of the decade.

References

External links 
 Personal website

1953 births
Living people
Norwegian businesspeople
Norwegian computer scientists
Place of birth missing (living people)